Kijowski is a Polish masculine surname, its feminine counterpart is Kijowska. It may refer to
Andrzej Kijowski (1928–1985), Polish literary critic, essayist and screenwriter
Andrzej Tadeusz Kijowski (born 1954), Polish aesthetician and critic
Jerzy Juliusz Kijowski (born 1943), Polish physicist
Mateusz Kijowski (born 1968), Polish IT specialist, journalist, social activist and blogger
Renata Kijowska (born 1975), Polish journalist

Polish-language surnames